The LG Chocolate³ (also known as the VX8560 or the upgraded VX8560EX) is a feature phone, and the successor to the LG Chocolate mobile phone for Verizon Wireless in the USA and Telus in Canada. It was released online July 14, 2008. The phone had several changes from the previous VX8500 Chocolate series such as a clam shell design, an external display, and a built-in FM transmitter.

Specifications

The complete LG VX8560 list of specifications are:

References

VX8560
Mobile phones introduced in 2008